Çatağıl can refer to:

 Çatağıl, Burdur
 Çatağıl, İscehisar